Pokomo (Kipfokomo) is a Bantu language spoken primarily along the East African coast near Tana River in the Tana River District by the Pokomo people of Kenya. Kipfokomo language originated from "Kingozi" the language, which Kiswahili was built from. "Kingozi" language is the precursor of Kiswahili. Pokomos are the only tribe in the world that speak "Kingozi" and sometimes are referred to as wangozi because they used to wear skins (Ngozi). All adult speakers of Pokomo are bilingual in Swahili, parts of East Africa's lingua franca. 

There is high of lexical similarity between other languages like Mvita (63%), Amu (61%), Mrima (60%), Kigiryama (59%), Chidigo (58%) or Bajun (57%).

References 

Languages of Kenya
Mijikenda
Tana River (Kenya)
Tana River County